Cedar River is an  stream in Antrim County in the U.S. state of Michigan and is part of the Elk River Chain of Lakes Watershed, a tributary of Lake Michigan.

Tributaries 
From the mouth:
 Blair Lake
 (left) North Branch Cedar River
 (left) Woolcott Creek
 (right) Scotts Spring

Drainage basin 
The Cedar River drains portions of the following in Antrim County:
 City of Bellaire
 Chestonia Township
 Custer Township
 Kearney Township
 Mancelona Township

References 

Rivers of Michigan
Rivers of Antrim County, Michigan
Tributaries of Lake Michigan